SpringHill Company is an entertainment development and production company founded in 2020 by LeBron James and Maverick Carter. Its board of directors includes Serena Williams. The company unites three earlier companies founded by James and Carter: SpringHill Entertainment, an entertainment production company founded in 2007, the Robot Company, an integrated marketing agency and brand and culture consultancy founded by Carter and James together with Paul Rivera, the creator of the talk show The Shop, and Uninterrupted, founded in 2015 with the aim to empower athletes by providing a platform that allows them to share their stories.

SpringHill Company signed a two-year scripted television deal with ABC Signature, a part of Disney Television Studios, in June 2020. In September 2020, the company signed a four-year first-look deal with Universal Pictures.

Like SpringHill Entertainment before, the company is named after the housing complex in Akron, where James was raised.

Filmography

Films

Television

Further reading

References

External links

2020 establishments in California
Companies based in Los Angeles
Mass media companies established in 2020
SpringHill Entertainment
Video production companies
American companies established in 2020